Operation Jubilee or the Dieppe Raid (19 August 1942) was an Allied amphibious attack on the German-occupied port of Dieppe in northern France, during the Second World War. Over 6,050 infantry, predominantly Canadian, supported by a regiment of tanks, were put ashore from a naval force operating under protection of Royal Air Force (RAF) fighters.

The port was to be captured and held for a short period, to test the feasibility of a landing and to gather intelligence. German coastal defences, port structures and important buildings were to be demolished. The raid was intended to boost Allied morale, demonstrate the commitment of the United Kingdom to re-open the Western Front and support the Soviet Union, fighting on the Eastern Front.

Aerial and naval support was insufficient to enable the ground forces to achieve their objectives; the tanks were trapped on the beach and the infantry was largely prevented from entering the town by obstacles and German fire. After less than six hours, mounting casualties forced a retreat. The operation was a fiasco in which only one landing force achieved its objective and some intelligence including electronic intelligence was gathered.

Within ten hours, 3,623 of the 6,086 men who landed had been killed, wounded or became prisoners of war. The  made a maximum effort against the landing as the RAF had expected, but the RAF lost 106 aircraft (at least 32 to anti-aircraft fire or accidents) against 48 German losses. The Royal Navy lost 33 landing craft and a destroyer. 

Both sides learned important lessons regarding coastal assaults. The Allies learned lessons that influenced the success of the D-Day landings. Artificial harbours were declared crucial, tanks were adapted specifically for beaches, a new integrated tactical air force strengthened ground support, and capturing a major port at the outset was no longer seen as a priority. Churchill and Mountbatten both claimed that these lessons had outweighed the cost. The Germans also believed that Dieppe was a learning experience and made a considerable effort to improve the way they defended the occupied coastlines of Europe.

Background

Dunkirk to Dieppe
In the aftermath of the Dunkirk evacuation of the British Expeditionary Force in May 1940, the British started on the development of a substantial raiding force under the umbrella of Combined Operations Headquarters. This was accompanied by the development of techniques and equipment for amphibious warfare. In late 1941, a scheme was put forward for the landing of 12 divisions around Le Havre, assuming a withdrawal of German troops to counter Soviet success in the east. From this came Operation Rutter to test the feasibility of capturing a port by an opposed landing, the investigation of the problems of operating the invasion fleet and testing equipment and techniques of the assault.

After its victory in the Battle of Britain in 1940 and the  having switched to night bombing in the fall of 1940, the day fighters of Royal Air Force Fighter Command were "a force without an immediate mission". In the second half of 1941, the aerial offensive over France was greatly stepped up, leading to the loss of 411 British and Canadian aircraft. In the spring of 1942, the  deployed the new Focke-Wulf Fw 190 fighter to its airfields in France.

The Fw 190 was superior to the Supermarine Spitfire Mk V and Hawker Hurricane Mk IIs used by the British and Canadian pilots and losses over France increased. The RAF was convinced it was winning the air war, believing that the loss of 259 Spitfires over France in the first six months of 1942 were justified by the reported destruction of 197 German aircraft in the same period. A major problem for the RAF was that the  German fighter pilots declined to engage in combat over the French coast and instead operated inland, forcing the British Spitfires to fly deeper into France, using up their fuel, placing them at a disadvantage when the  engaged, and, critically, if RAF pilots had to bail out they would be in enemy occupied territory, i.e. RAF Fighter command was now operating with all the disadvantages the  had to contend with in the Battle of Britain. Fighter Command lobbied in early 1942, for a raid to seize a French port to provoke the  into action with the RAF at an advantage.

Dieppe
Dieppe, a coastal town in the Seine-Inférieure department of France, is built along a long cliff that overlooks the English Channel. The river Scie is on the western end of the town and the Arques flows through the town and into a medium-sized harbour. In 1942, the Germans had demolished some seafront buildings to aid in coastal defence and had set up two large artillery batteries at Berneval-le-Grand and Varengeville-sur-Mer. One important consideration for the planners was that Dieppe was within range of the RAF's fighter aircraft.

There was also intense pressure from the Soviet government to open a second front in Western Europe. By early 1942, the Wehrmacht's Operation Barbarossa had clearly failed to destroy the Soviet Union. However, the Germans in a much less ambitious summer offensive launched in June, were deep into southern Soviet territory, pushing toward Stalingrad. Joseph Stalin himself repeatedly demanded that the Allies create a second front in France to force the Germans to move at least 40 divisions away from the Eastern Front to remove some of the pressure put on the Red Army in the Soviet Union.

The proposed Allied invasion of continental Europe in 1943, Operation Roundup, was considered impractical by military planners, and the alternative of landing in 1942, Operation Sledgehammer, even more difficult. The British had been engaged with the Italians and the Germans in the Western Desert campaign since June 1940. At the Second Washington Conference in June 1942, U.S. President Franklin D. Roosevelt and British Prime Minister Winston Churchill decided to postpone the cross-English Channel invasion and schedule Operation Torch, the Anglo-American invasion of French North Africa, for later that year. In the interim, a large-scale Canadian-led raid on the French coast was intended to take some of the pressure off the Soviet Union.

The objective of the raid was discussed by Winston Churchill in his war memoirs:

Role of Louis Mountbatten 
On the directive of Winston Churchill, Louis Mountbatten was recalled from captaincy of the aircraft carrier HMS Illustrious while it was under repair in USA in 1941 and instated as 'Adviser on Combined Operations' of the British Army (replacing Admiral Roger Keyes who as 'Director of Combined Operations' had fallen out with the Chiefs of Staff and Churchill), later to be promoted to the post of 'Chief of Combined Operations' on 4 March 1942. Churchill personally briefed Mountbatten that he wanted raids of increasing intensity, developing equipment and training with a view to the invasion of France; the Chiefs of Staff directive limited Mountbatten's authority to approve only small raids using special service troops. He held a dual role as Adviser to the Chiefs of  Staff and 'Commodore Combined Operations' handling the administration of both small raids and larger operations. In 1942 Mountbatten was raised by Churchill as a full member of meetings of the Chiefs of Staff with acting rank of vice-admiral, air marshal and lieutenant general. In May 1942 it was agreed that Combined Operations HQ would handle detailed planning of the Dieppe raid.

COHQ proposed flanking landings that would take Dieppe in a pincer movement, Home Forces argued for a frontal attack as, within the 15 hour window of the raid, the flank attacks would not have enough time to achieve success. At meetings Mountbatten argued that it was sufficient for the raid to show that the tactics would have worked, Montgomery countered that if the raid did not take Dieppe it would be seen as a failure. An initial heavy bombardment from the air was approved (despite concerns about civilian casualties) then rescinded due to army opinion that wreckage would block streets for the tanks and RAF belief that most of the bombs would end up in the sea or inland. Mountbatten pressed for the firepower of a battleship for bombardment in lieu of bombing but neither this nor cruisers was permitted. Equally, Combined Operations' proposed assault force of marines and commandos was passed over in favour of untried Canadian troops. 

Mountbatten was well known for his chivalry and charming abilities, however he lacked experience in terms of actual warfare. Even before taking up this role, Mountbatten had faced a rough patch at sea captaining the British Navy's HMS Kelly as commander of the 5th Destroyer Flotilla, where his performance was so below par that Denis Healey — who was Secretary of State for Defence when Mountbatten was Chief of the Defence Staff in the 1960s — remarked: "but his birth saved him from the court martial any other officer would have faced".

Despite his shortcomings, Mountbatten played an important role in the planning of the whole operation. The Dieppe raid was intended as an experiment and was initially planned to take place at the end of June 1942. Preparations were in full swing with two rehearsals taking place in Bridport on 13th and 23rd Jun; the second due to the debacle the first turned into. However, bad weather delayed the operation by three weeks and  two vessels that were to be used had been put out action by bombs. This made the Chiefs of Staff uneasy thinking that the Germans would have found out about the attack by then as the plan was no longer a secret to the more than 10,000 Allied troops who had been informed of it. On 8 July, General Bernard Montgomery recommended to call off the attack altogether and the idea would probably have been shelved had it not been for Mountbatten's proposal to relaunch the operation six weeks later still aiming at Dieppe. His argument was that although the enemy must have found out that Dieppe had been the original target, "the very last thing they'd (Germans) ever imagine is that we would be so stupid as to lay on the same operation again". 

Mountbatten's hubristic approach convinced the generals to go ahead with the plan, which ultimately turned out to be catastrophic. Although Churchill, Eisenhower and Mountbatten collectively staved off any blame for the outcome, Mountbatten bore the brunt of it. Mountbatten was reluctant to accept the blame and shifted it to peripheral reasons by passing apologetic and sometimes insensitive remarks.

Operation Rutter
Operation Rutter was devised to satisfy several objectives, as a show of support for the Soviet Union, to provide an opportunity for the Canadian forces in Britain to engage the German Army and as a morale booster for the British public, among whom were vociferous supporters of a second front to give tangible support to the Red Army. From a military point of view, when the real invasion of Europe began, it would be important quickly to capture a port before the Germans could demolish the facilities or re-capture it by a counter-attack. The extent of the German fortification of French ports was uncertain and how organised an amphibious attack could be after a Channel crossing and how a surprise element could be achieved was also in doubt. Rutter could provide the experience that would be needed later in the war. Rutter was a combined operation, involving heavy bombers of RAF Bomber Command and the heavy ships of the Royal Navy to bombard German defences overlooking the beaches; parachute and glider troops would silence German heavy artillery commanding the approaches to the port. The main force of infantry and tanks would land and advance through the port to the outskirts and dig in to resist counter-attacks until it was time to withdraw and re-embark in their landing craft. The 2nd Canadian Infantry Division was chosen for the operation and given three months' specialist training in amphibious operations up to July. The Canadians assembled at embarkation ports and went aboard their ships, where the target was revealed. German aircraft spotting and bombing the assembled ships and inclement weather forced a delay in sailing and on 7 July, Rutter was cancelled and the troops disembarked.

Prelude

Operation Jubilee

The Dieppe landings were planned on six beaches: four in front of the town itself, and two to the eastern and western flanks respectively.  From east to west, the beaches were codenamed Yellow, Blue, Red, White, Green and Orange. No. 3 Commando would land on Yellow beach, the Royal Regiment of Canada on Blue. The main landings would take place on Red and White beaches by the Royal Hamilton Light Infantry, the Essex Scottish Regiment, Les Fusiliers Mont-Royal, A Commando Royal Marines and the armour. The South Saskatchewan Regiment and the Queen's Own Cameron Highlanders of Canada would land on Green Beach, and No. 4 Commando on Orange.

Armoured support was provided by the 14th Army Tank Regiment (The Calgary Regiment (Tank)) with 58 of the newly introduced Churchill tanks in their first use in combat, to be delivered using the new landing craft tank (LCT). The Churchills, adapted to operate in the shallows near the beach, were a mix of types; some armed with a QF 2-pdr (40mm) gun in the turret and a close support 3-inch howitzer in the hull, some had the QF 6-pdr (57 mm), and three Churchills were equipped with flame-throwers. Engineers would use explosives to remove obstacles for the tanks.

Naval support

The Royal Navy supplied 237 ships and landing craft. However, pre-landing naval gunfire support was limited, consisting of six Hunt-class destroyers each with four or six 4-inch (102 mm) guns. This was because of the reluctance of First Sea Lord Sir Dudley Pound to risk capital ships in an area he believed vulnerable to attacks by German aircraft.

Air plan

Fighter Command

Over the past eighteen months of inconclusive attritional engagements, Fighter Command had established a measure of air superiority within range of its fighters. Day incursions into British airspace had dwindled to the occasional pair of German fighter bombers racing across the Channel, dropping their bombs and racing back. At 06:15 on 7 July, two ships in the Solent, with troops for Rutter on board, were hit but the bombs failed to explode and passed through their hulls, causing only four casualties. German photographic reconnaissance was much more difficult, because adequate results required the aircraft to fly a set course and height. Repeat sorties once or twice a week were ideal for comparative analysis of photographs but the  could manage only one set of pictures a month. A partial reconnaissance was obtained from 28 to 31 July, after Rutter had been cancelled and not again until 24 August, five days after Jubilee. Four Mustang Mk I squadrons of Army Cooperation Command were provided for long-range reconnaissance and a contingent of five bomber squadrons were to participate for smoke laying and tactical bombing.

Leigh-Mallory controlled the air battle from 11 Group headquarters at RAF Uxbridge; commands flowing through the system as normal to Sector control rooms and from there to the airfields. An RAF officer from Hut 3 at Bletchley Park was seconded to the 11 Group Operations Room to filter material to the Y-stations at RAF Cheadle and RAF Kingsdown which intercepted Wireless telegraphy (W/T) and Radio telephony (R/T) transmissions and used direction finding to pinpoint the origin of the signals. The intention was to reduce the time to pass decryptions of material from German radar, observer posts and fighter control to 11 Group through "the most expert officer in Y on German Fighter Defence and its ramifications". The Fighter Controllers on the Headquarters ship  and  could communicate with the raid fighter cover on a shared frequency. The "Close Support" fighters checked in with the headquarters ship as they approached so the Fighter Controller could direct them onto alternative targets as required.

The moving of squadrons within 11 Group and reinforcement with 15 squadrons from outside 11 Group were carried out 14–15 August under the guise of "Exercise Venom".

2 Group

On 29 June, 2 Group, Bomber Command, was ordered to send sixteen Douglas Bostons each from 88 Squadron and 107 Squadron from their East Anglian bases to RAF Ford in West Sussex; 226 Squadron, with its long range Bostons, was to stand by at its base for Operation Rutter. From 4 July, aircraft were to be maintained at thirty minutes readiness to fly Circus operations against German road transport and any tanks that appeared. For speed the crews were briefed in advance and were to have a final briefing at their airfield dispersals just before take-off. On 14 August, 2 Group was notified that the raid on Dieppe was back on as Operation Jubilee. The move to RAF Ford was retained but 226 Squadron was to fly from RAF Thruxton in Hampshire to lay smoke screens to obstruct German gunners on the high ground around Dieppe. No. 226 Squadron, joined by four crews from the other squadrons, began training at Thruxton on smoke munitions,  smoke bombs and Smoke Curtain Installations, carried in the bomb bays of some of the Bostons, which were to take off before dawn and operate without fighter escort.

Intelligence
Intelligence on the area was sparse: there were dug-in German gun positions on the cliffs, but these had not been detected or spotted by air reconnaissance photographers. The planners had assessed the beach gradient and its suitability for tanks only by scanning holiday snapshots, which led to an underestimation of the German strength and of the terrain.  The outline plan for the abortive Operation Rutter (which became the basis for Operation Jubilee) stated that "intelligence reports indicate that Dieppe is not heavily defended and that the beaches in the vicinity are suitable for landing infantry, and armoured fighting vehicles at some".

German forces

Army

The Germans were aware that the Allies might launch a large-scale amphibious operation some time in summer 1942. In July, Supreme Commander in the West Field Marshal Gerd von Rundstedt wrote an assessment which concluded that paratroops were to be expected, as well as a large Allied fighter and bomber force. Rundstedt wrote that "at the point of landing, the enemy will win command of the air. He will then use the bulk of his air forces against defences on the ground ... The enemy – in order to achieve an attack en masse – will use all the aircraft he has, even slower types".

In August, German forces at Dieppe were on high alert, having been warned by French double agents that the British were showing interest in the area. They had also detected increased radio traffic and landing craft being concentrated in the southern British coastal ports. Dieppe and the flanking cliffs were well defended; the 1,500-strong garrison from the 302nd Static Infantry Division comprised the Infantry Regiments 570, 571 and 572, each of two battalions, the 302nd Artillery Regiment, the 302nd Reconnaissance Battalion, the 302nd Anti-tank Battalion, the 302nd Engineer Battalion and 302nd Signal Battalion. They were deployed along the beaches of Dieppe and the neighbouring towns, covering all the likely landing places. The city and port were protected by heavy artillery on the main approach (particularly in the myriad cliff caves) and with a reserve at the rear. The defenders were stationed in the towns and in intervening open areas and highlands that overlooked the beaches.  Elements of the 571st Infantry Regiment defended the Dieppe radar station near Pourville and the artillery battery over the Scie river at Varengeville. To the east, the Infantry Regiment 570 was deployed near the artillery battery at Berneval-le-Grand.

The  fighter force comprised Jagdgeschwader 2 (JG2) and Jagdgeschwader 26 (JG26), with about 120 serviceable fighters, mostly Fw 190s to oppose the landings and escort around 100 serviceable bombers of Kampfgeschwader 2 and the specialist anti-shipping bombers of III./Kampfgeschwader 53 (KG 53), II./Kampfgeschwader 40 (KG 40) and I./Kampfgeschwader 77 (KG 77) mostly equipped with Dornier 217s.

Battle

On the night of 18/19 August, RAF Coastal Command carried out anti-surface vessel patrols of the coast from Boulogne to Cherbourg; after sunrise the patrols were carried out by fighters. The Allied fleet left the south coast of England during the night, preceded by minesweepers from Newhaven clearing paths through the English Channel, followed by the flotilla of eight destroyers and accompanying Motor Gun Boats escorting the landing craft and Motor Launches.

Initial landings
The initial landings began at 04:50 on 19 August, with attacks on the artillery batteries on the flanks of the main landing area. These were Varengeville – Sainte-Marguerite-sur-Mer (known as Orange Beach) by No. 4 Commando, Pourville (Green Beach) by the South Saskatchewan Regiment and the Queen's Own Cameron Highlanders of Canada, Puys (Blue Beach) by the Royal Regiment of Canada, and Berneval (Yellow Beach) by No. 3 Commando. On their way in, the landing craft and escorts heading towards Puys and Berneval ran into and exchanged fire with a small German convoy at 03:48. The Allied destroyers  and ORP Ślązak noticed the engagement, but their commanders incorrectly assumed that the landing craft had come under fire from the shore batteries and did not come to their rescue.

Yellow beach

The battery could fire upon the landing at Dieppe  to the west. The three  and four  guns of 2/770 Batterie had to be out of action by the time the main force approached the main beach.

The craft carrying No. 3 Commando, approaching the coast to the east, were not warned of the approach of a German coastal convoy that had been located by British "Chain Home" radar stations at 21:30. German S-boats escorting a German tanker torpedoed some of the LCP landing craft and disabled the escorting Steam Gun Boat 5. Subsequently, ML 346 (commanded by Lt. A.D. Fear RNVR DSC) and Landing Craft Flak 1 combined to drive off the German boats but the group was dispersed, with some losses. The commandos from six craft who did land on Yellow I were beaten back and, unable to safely retreat or join the main force, had to surrender. Only 18 commandos got ashore on Yellow II beach. They reached the perimeter of the battery via Berneval, after it was attacked by Hurricane fighter-bombers, engaging their target with small arms fire. Although unable to destroy the guns, their sniping for a time managed to distract the battery to such good effect that the gunners fired wildly and there was no known instance of this battery sinking any of the assault convoy ships off Dieppe. The commandos were eventually forced to withdraw in the face of superior enemy forces.

Orange beach

Landing on the right flank in force at 04:50, they climbed the steep slope and attacked and neutralised their target, the artillery battery of six 150 mm guns. This was the only success of Operation Jubilee. The commando then withdrew at 07:30 as planned. Most of No. 4 safely returned to England. This portion of the raid was considered a model for future amphibious Royal Marine Commando assaults as part of major landing operations. Lord Lovat was awarded the Distinguished Service Order for his part in the raid and Captain Patrick Porteous No. 4 Commando, was awarded the Victoria Cross.

Blue beach

The naval engagement between the small German convoy and the craft carrying No. 3 Commando had alerted the German defenders at Blue beach. The landing near Puys by the Royal Regiment of Canada plus three platoons from the Black Watch of Canada and an artillery detachment were tasked to neutralise machine gun and artillery batteries protecting this Dieppe beach.
They were delayed by 20 minutes and the smoke screens that should have hidden their assault had already lifted. The advantages of surprise and darkness were thus lost, while the Germans had manned their defensive positions in preparation for the landings. The well-fortified German forces held the Canadian forces that did land on the beach. As soon as they reached the shore, the Canadians found themselves pinned against the seawall, unable to advance. With a German bunker placed to sweep along the back of the seawall, the Royal Regiment of Canada was annihilated. Of the 556 men in the regiment, 200 were killed and 264 captured.

Green Beach

On Green beach at the same time that No. 4 Commando had landed at Orange Beach, the South Saskatchewan Regiment's 1st Battalion was headed towards Pourville. They beached at 04:52, without having been detected. The battalion managed to leave their landing craft before the Germans could open fire. However, on the way in, some of the landing craft had drifted off course and most of the battalion found themselves west of the River Scie rather than east of it. Because they had been landed in the wrong place, the battalion, whose objective was the hills east of the village and the Hindenburg Battery artillery, had to enter Pourville to cross the river by the only bridge. Before the Saskatchewans managed to reach the bridge, the Germans had positioned machine guns and anti-tank guns there which stopped their advance. With the battalion's dead and wounded piling up on the bridge, Lieutenant Colonel Charles Merritt, the commanding officer, attempted to give the attack impetus by repeatedly and openly crossing the bridge, in order to demonstrate that it was feasible to do so. However, despite the assault resuming, the South Saskatchewans and the Queen's Own Cameron Highlanders of Canada, who had landed beside them, were unable to reach their target. While the Camerons did manage to penetrate further inland than any other troops that day, they were also soon forced back as German reinforcements rushed to the scene. Both battalions suffered more losses as they withdrew; only 341 men were able to reach the landing craft and embark, and the rest were left to surrender. For his part in the battle, Lieutenant Colonel Merritt was awarded the Victoria Cross.

Pourville radar station

One of the objectives of the Dieppe Raid was to discover the importance and performance of a German radar station on the cliff-top to the east of the town of Pourville. To achieve this, RAF Flight Sergeant Jack Nissenthall, a radar specialist, was attached to the South Saskatchewan Regiment landing at Green Beach. He was to attempt to enter the radar station and learn its secrets, accompanied by a small unit of 11 men of the Saskatchewans as bodyguards. Nissenthall volunteered for the mission fully aware that, due to the highly sensitive nature of his knowledge of Allied radar technology, his Saskatchewan bodyguard unit was under orders to kill him to prevent him from being captured. He also carried a cyanide pill as a last resort.

After the war, Lord Mountbatten claimed to author James Leasor, when being interviewed during research for the book Green Beach, that "If I had been aware of the orders given to the escort to shoot him rather than let him be captured, I would have cancelled them immediately". Nissenthall and his bodyguards failed to overcome the radar station defences but Nissenthall was able to crawl up to the rear of the station under enemy fire and cut all telephone wires leading to it. The operators inside resorted to radio to talk to their commanders which was intercepted by listening posts on the south coast of England. The Allies were able to learn a great deal about the improved accuracy, location, capacity and density of German radar stations along the Channel coast which helped to convince Allied commanders of the importance of developing radar jamming technology. Only Nissenthall and one South Saskatchewan of the party returned to England.

Main Canadian landings

Red and White Beaches

Preparing the ground for the main landings, four destroyers were bombarding the coast as landing craft approached. At 05:15, they were joined by five RAF Hurricane squadrons who bombed the coastal defences and set a smokescreen to protect the assault troops. Between 03:30, and 03:40, 30 minutes after the initial landings, the main frontal assault by The Essex Scottish Regiment and the Royal Hamilton Light Infantry started. Their infantry was meant to be supported by Churchill tanks of the 14th Army Tank Regiment landing at the same time, but the tanks arrived on the beach late. As a result, the two infantry battalions had to attack without armour support. They were met with heavy machine-gun fire from emplacements dug into the overlooking cliffs. Unable to clear the obstacles and scale the seawall, they suffered heavy losses. Captain Denis Whitaker of the Royal Hamilton Light Infantry recalled a scene of absolute carnage and confusion, with soldiers being cut down by German fire all along the sea wall while his commanding officer, Colonel Bob Labatt, desperately tried to use a broken radio to contact General Roberts while ignoring his men. When the tanks eventually arrived only 29 were landed. Two of those sank in deep water, and 12 more became bogged down in the soft shingle beach. Only 15 of the tanks made it up to and across the seawall. Once they crossed the seawall, they were confronted by a series of tank obstacles that prevented their entry into the town. Blocked from going further, they were forced to return to the beach where they provided fire support for the now retreating infantry. None of the tanks managed to return to England. All the crews that landed were either killed or captured.

Unaware of the situation on the beaches because of a smoke screen laid by the supporting destroyers, Major General Roberts sent in the two reserve units: the Fusiliers Mont-Royal and the Royal Marines. At 07:00, the Fusiliers under the command of Lieutenant Colonel Dollard Ménard in 26 landing craft sailed towards their beach. They were heavily engaged by the Germans, who hit them with heavy machine gun, mortar and grenade fire, and destroyed them; only a few men managed to reach the town. Those men were then sent in towards the centre of Dieppe and became pinned down under the cliffs and Roberts ordered the Royal Marines to land in order to support them. Not being prepared to support the Fusiliers, the Royal Marines had to transfer from their gunboats and motorboat transports onto landing craft. The Royal Marine landing craft were heavily engaged on their way in with many destroyed or disabled. Those Royal Marines that did reach the shore were either killed or captured. As he became aware of the situation the Royal Marine commanding officer Lieutenant Colonel Phillipps, stood upon the stern of his landing craft and signalled for the rest of his men to turn back. He was killed a few moments later.

During the raid, a mortar platoon from the Calgary Highlanders, commanded by Lieutenant F. J. Reynolds, was attached to the landing force but stayed offshore after the tanks on board (code-named Bert and Bill) landed.  Sergeants Lyster and Pittaway were Mentioned in Despatches for their part in shooting down two German aircraft and one officer of the battalion was killed while ashore with a brigade headquarters.

At 09:40, under heavy fire, the withdrawal from the main landing beaches began and was completed by 14:00.

Air operations

At 04:16 six Bostons attacked German coastal artillery in the twilight which led to the results not being observed. A smoke screen  drifted  seawards, thickened by the smoke of a burning field of wheat. Six Bristol Blenheim bombers from 13 Squadron and one from 614 Squadron dropped  phosphorus bombs south of German  sites. Nine of the twelve Bostons were damaged, two crashed on landing and one Blenheim smoke-layer from 614 Squadron was damaged and the pilot wounded, the aircraft crashing on landing and bursting into flames. Just before 08:00 two squadrons of cannon-armed Hurricanes were ordered to attack E-boats coming from Boulogne; they were accompanied by two fighter cover squadrons.

The airfield at Abbeville-Drucat was attacked by 24 Boeing B-17 Flying Fortresses, escorted by four squadrons of USAAF Spitfire IXs at 10:30 putting it out of action for "two vital hours". After the attack, a wing of Typhoons made a feint towards Ostend The Mustangs reconnoitred outside the main area looking for reinforcements on the roads to Dieppe and from Amiens, Rouen, Yvetot and Le Havre. Flying from RAF Gatwick, they contacted the HQ ship then, having flown a sortie, passed information to the HQ ship before returning to Gatwick and phoning report to the air commander. Reconnaissance sorties were stopped after 12:00 Although taken by surprise, the German fighters soon began to attack the air umbrella. The RAF was moderately successful in protecting the ground and sea forces from aerial bombing but were hampered by operating far from their home bases. Spitfires were at the limit of their range, with some only being able to spend five minutes over the combat area.

As more German aircraft appeared, the number of British aircraft over Dieppe was increased from three to six squadrons and at times up to nine squadrons were present.

Six squadrons (four British, two Canadian) flew the Spitfire Mk IX, the only British fighter equal to the Fw 190, on its operational debut at Dieppe. During the battle, Fighter Command flew 2,500 sorties over Dieppe. The plan to centralise information gleaned from German radar, W/T and R/T and other transmissions failed because the  operation against the landing overwhelmed the reporting system and the war room at 11 Group HQ was overwhelmed with reports as the  reaction increased. RAF Kingsdown was not informed about developments and failed to identify German fighter reinforcements arriving from all over France and the Low Countries. The new 6IS Fish party, to decrypt high-speed non-Morse transmissions via the German , had no time to prepare and missed important information.

Aftermath

Analyses

German

The capture of a copy of the Dieppe plan allowed the Germans to analyse the operation. Rundstedt criticised the plan's rigidity, saying that "the plan is in German terms not a plan, it is more a position paper or the intended course of an exercise." Other senior German officers were equally unimpressed; General Konrad Haase considered it "incomprehensible" that a division was expected to overrun a German regiment that was supported by artillery, "...the strength of naval and air forces was entirely insufficient to suppress the defenders during the landings". General Adolf-Friedrich Kuntzen could not understand why the Pourville landings were not reinforced with tanks where they might have succeeded in leaving the beach. The Germans were unimpressed by the Churchill tanks left behind; the armament and armour were compared unfavourably with that used in German and Soviet tanks. 

The  was pleased with how it had performed during the air battle. One report judged the FW-190, which formed the bulk of the air defence, to be 'in every 
way suitable as a fighter-bomber'. It ascribed its good performance despite its marked numerical superiority to the "aggressiveness and better training of the German fighter pilots". The  had been so active during the battle that only 70 of the 230 airframes available at the start of the day were combat ready by day's end. The  had consumed all its 20mm cannon ammunition available in the West, so much so that there was not enough for routine flight operations in the next couple of days.

The Germans were pleased with their successful defence whilst noting faults in their own communications, transport and location of support forces but recognised that the Allies were certain to learn some lessons from the operation and set about improving the fixed defences. As the overall theatre commander in the West, Rundstedt was adamant that the Germans must learn Dieppe's lessons. He was anxious that the Germans were not left behind in learning from Dieppe: "Just as we have gained the most valuable experience from the day of Dieppe, the enemy has learnt as well. Just as we evaluate the experience for the future, so will the enemy. Perhaps he will do this to an even greater extent because he has paid so dearly for it".

The Dieppe raid also provoked longer-term strategic decisions. In October,  Hitler's high command produced a "Memorandum Regarding Experiences in Coastal Defence", which was provoked in large part by Dieppe. This document provided a framework for German commanders to plan coastal defence in the future. It laid down, amongst other principles, that air superiority was the key to a successful coastal defence strategy.

Allied
Dieppe became a textbook example of "what not to do" in amphibious operations and laid the framework for the Normandy landings two years later. Dieppe showed the need for 
 Preliminary artillery support, including aerial bombardment
 Surprise
 Proper intelligence concerning enemy fortifications
 Avoidance of a frontal attack on a defended port
 Proper re-embarkation craft

While the Canadian contingent fought boldly in the face of a determined enemy, it was ultimately circumstances outside their control which sealed their fate. Despite criticism concerning the inexperience of the Canadian brigades, scholars have noted that even seasoned professionals would have been hard-pressed under the deplorable conditions brought about by their superiors. The commanders who planned the raid on Dieppe had not envisaged such losses. This was one of the first attempts by the Western Allies on a German-held port city. As a consequence, planning from the highest ranks in preparation for the raid was minimal. Basic strategic and tactical errors were made which resulted in a higher than expected Allied (particularly Canadian) death rate.

To help future landings, the British would develop specialist armoured vehicles for engineers to perform tasks protected by armour. Because the tracks of most of the Churchill tanks were caught up in the shingle beach, the Allies began to study beach geology where they intended to land and adapting vehicles for them. The Allies changed their view that capturing a major port was necessary to establish a second front; the damage inflicted on a port to capture it and by the Germans firing demolition charges would make it useless afterwards. Prefabricated Mulberry harbours were to be built and towed to beaches during the invasion.

While the RAF were generally able to keep German aircraft from the land battle and the ships, the operation demonstrated the need for air superiority as well as showing "major deficiencies in RAF ground support techniques" and this led to the creation of an integrated tactical air force for army support.

Casualties

Of the nearly 5,000-strong Canadian contingent, 3,367 were killed, wounded or taken prisoner, an exceptional casualty rate of 68 percent. The 1,000 British Commandos lost 247 men. The Royal Navy lost the destroyer Berkeley (on the return crossing, it was hit by bombs from a Fw 190 and then scuttled by Albrighton) and 33 landing craft, suffering 550 dead and wounded. The RAF lost 106 aircraft. RAF Air Sea Rescue Services picked up around 20 pilots at the loss of three of Dover's five High Speed Launches. Among the RAF losses, six RAF aircraft had been shot down by gunners on their own side, one Typhoon was shot down by a Spitfire  and two others were lost when their tails broke off (a structural issue with early Typhoons), and two Spitfires collided during the withdrawal across the Channel.

The Germans suffered 591 casualties, 322 fatal and 280 wounded, 48 aircraft and one patrol boat. Of the 50 US Army Rangers serving in Commando units, six were killed, seven wounded and four captured.

The losses at Dieppe were claimed to be a necessary evil. Mountbatten later justified the raid by arguing that lessons learned at Dieppe in 1942 were put to good use later in the war. He later claimed, "I have no doubt that the Battle of Normandy was won on the beaches of Dieppe. For every man who died in Dieppe, at least 10 more must have been spared in Normandy in 1944." In direct response to the raid on Dieppe, Churchill remarked that "My Impression of 'Jubilee' is that the results fully justified the heavy cost" and that it "was a Canadian contribution of the greatest significance to final victory."

To others, especially Canadians, it was a major disaster. The exception was the success gained by the battle-hardened British commandos against the coast artillery batteries near Varengeville. Of the nearly 5,000 Canadian soldiers, more than 900 were killed (about 18 per cent) and 1,874 taken prisoner (37%).

German propaganda

Dieppe was a German propaganda coup in which the Dieppe raid was described as a military joke, noting the amount of time needed to plan such an attack, combined with the losses suffered by the Allies, pointed only to incompetence. The propaganda value of German news on the raid was enhanced by British foot-dragging, Allied media being forced to carry announcements from German sources. These attempts were made to rally the morale of the German people despite the growing intensity of the Allied strategic bombing campaign on German cities, and large daily casualties on the Eastern Front. Marshal Philippe Pétain of France wrote a letter of congratulation to the German Army for "cleansing French soil of the invader" of this "most recent British aggression". Pétain suggested that French troops be allowed to serve with German coastal garrisons; this suggestion was not viewed with enthusiasm by the German Army and nothing came of it. The letter was given much publicity in Germany and France as a sign of how the French people allegedly appreciated Germany's efforts to defend them from les Anglo-Saxons. Pétain's letter was later used as an exhibit for the prosecution at his trial for high treason in 1945.

The air battle
Other sources suggest that up to 28 bombers were lost and that the figure for destroyed and damaged Spitfires was 70. The  suffered 48 aircraft losses, 28 bombers, half of them Dornier Do 217s from KG 2; JG 2 lost 14 Fw 190s and eight pilots killed, JG 26 lost six Fw 190s with their pilots. The RAF lost 91 aircraft shot down and 64 pilots; 47 killed and 17 taken prisoner, the RCAF lost 14 aircraft and nine pilots and 2 Group lost six bombers. Leigh-Mallory considered the losses "remarkably light in view of the number of Squadrons taking part and the intensity of the fighting" noting that the tactical reconnaissance suffered heaviest with about two casualties per squadron. The  in France was back to full strength within days of the raid. Copp wrote that Dieppe failed to inflict the knockout blow against the  that the RAF sought. Although the Allies continued to lose on average two aircraft for every one German aircraft destroyed for the rest of 1942, the output of fighters by the United States, Britain and Canada combined with better Allied pilot training, led to the  gradually losing the war of attrition in the skies above France. Copp concluded that: "The battle for air superiority was won [on] many fronts by continuous effort and August 19, 1942 was part of that achievement". The Forward Air Controller, Air Commodore Adrian Cole,  was injured when Calpe was attacked and was awarded the DSO for gallantry.

Prisoners of war
Brigadier William Southam brought ashore his copy of the assault plan, classified as a secret document. Southam tried to bury it under the pebbles at the time of his surrender but was spotted and the plan retrieved by the Germans. The plan, later criticised for its size and needless complexity, contained orders to shackle prisoners. The British Special Service Brigade tied the hands of prisoners taken on raids and the practice had been ordered for the Dieppe Raid "to prevent destruction of their documents". Roberts objected to this with the chief of combined operations. After capturing the orders for Operation Jubilee, the Germans threatened on 2 September to shackle the prisoners taken at Dieppe. The War Office announced that if an order existed it would be rescinded and the Germans withdrew the threat on 3 September. On 8 October British and Canadian prisoners were tied in reprisal, which led to counter reprisals. Supposed violations of the Geneva Convention committed by Allied commandos against German POWs at Dieppe and Sark was one of the reasons Hitler gave for the Commando Order of October 1942 for all Allied commando prisoners to be executed.

Civilians
Civilians were handed leaflets by the Canadians telling them it was only a raid and not to get involved; despite this a small number of civilians provided help to the wounded and later passed clothing and food to Canadian prisoners. Civilians also volunteered to help collect and bury the Canadian fallen, including the 475 washed ashore. For the town residents' "perfect discipline and calm", although the residents had not had much time to furnish the invaders with an instant Fifth Column, Hitler gave the town a gift of Fr 10 million, to repair the damage caused during the raid.

German preparedness

The fiasco has led to a discussion of whether the Germans knew of the raid in advance.  Since June 1942, the BBC had been broadcasting warnings to French civilians of a "likely" action, urging them to quickly evacuate the Atlantic coastal districts. Indeed, on the day of the raid itself, the BBC announced it, albeit at 08:00, after the landings had taken place.

First-hand accounts and memoirs of many Canadian veterans who documented their experiences on the shores of Dieppe remark about the preparedness of the German defences as if they were warned, on touching down on the Dieppe shore, the landing ships were immediately shelled with the utmost precision as troops disembarked. Commanding officer Lt Colonel Labatt testified to having seen markers on the beach used for mortar practice, which appeared to have been recently placed.

The belief that the Germans were forewarned has been strengthened by accounts of German and Allied POWs. Major C. E. Page, while interrogating a German soldier, found out that four machine-gun battalions were brought in "specifically" in anticipation of a raid. There are numerous accounts of interrogated German prisoners, German captors and French citizens who all conveyed to Canadians that the Germans had been preparing for the landing for weeks. Captain Stephen Roskill, Britain's  official naval historian, wrote an article for the prestigious Royal United Services Institution arguing the opposite case in 1964. Roskill's article relied on German documentary evidence to show that any warnings of an Allied raid on Dieppe were purely coincidental.

The German convoy that bumped into the Allied ships failed to get messages to shore due to damage to their radio aerials in the fire fight; however, the operator of the long range Freya 28 (Radar) at Pourville correctly identified five columns of stationary ships at 03:45 at a range of 35 km. An alert was given to the Navy command who did not believe the warning, but when the ships started to head to shore a further warning was given at 04:35. Troops along the coast had heard gun fire out to sea and some units went to alert. It was 05:05 before German orders came from Le Havre for artillery to open fire. Within an hour the extent of the attack was being understood by German command and reserves were notified to prepare to move to the coast.

Daily Telegraph crossword controversy
On 17 August 1942, the clue "French port (6)" appeared in the Daily Telegraph crossword (compiled by Leonard Dawe), followed by the solution, "Dieppe"; the raid on Dieppe took place the next day, on 19 August. The War Office suspected that the crossword had been used to pass intelligence to the Germans and called upon Lord Tweedsmuir, a senior intelligence officer attached to the Canadian Army, to investigate. Tweedsmuir later said, "We noticed that the crossword contained the word 'Dieppe', and there was an immediate and exhaustive inquiry which also involved MI5. But in the end, it was concluded that it was just a remarkable coincidence — a complete fluke". A similar crossword coincidence occurred in May 1944, prior to D-Day. Multiple terms associated with Operation Overlord (including the word "Overlord") appeared in the Daily Telegraph crossword (also written by Dawe) and after another investigation by MI5 which concluded that it was another coincidence. Further to this, a former student identified that Dawe frequently requested words from his students, many of whom were children in the same area as US military personnel.

The Enigma pinch
Research undertaken over a 15-year period by military historian David O'Keefe uncovered 100,000 pages of classified British military archival files that documented a "pinch" mission overseen by Ian Fleming (best known later as author of the James Bond novels), coinciding with the Dieppe Raid. O'Keefe states that No. 30 Commando was sent to Dieppe to capture one of the new German 4-rotor Enigma code machines, plus associated codebooks and rotor setting sheets. The Naval Intelligence Division (NID) planned the "pinch" to pass such items to cryptanalysts at Bletchley Park to assist with Ultra decryption operations. According to O'Keefe the presence of other troops landing at Dieppe was to provide support and create a distraction for the commando units ordered to reach the German admiralty headquarters and capture the Enigma machine; they were a cover for the Enigma target.

No. 30 Commando was formed, as the Special Intelligence Unit, in September
1942 (a month after the raid), composed of 33 (Royal Marines) Troop, 34 (Army) Troop, 35 (RAF) Troop and 36 (Royal Navy) Troop. It was later renamed 30 RN Commando (Special Engineering Unit). Later research identified the unit in the Dieppe raid as No. 3 Troop of No. 10 (Inter-Allied) Commando, known as the X-Troop.

In August 2017,  naval historian Eric Grove described 'Enigma Pinch' as "more a reflection of the contemporary fascination with secret intelligence rather than the reality of 1942." Obtaining useful intelligence was among the objectives - including the capture of a four-rotor Enigma cipher machine but it was one of many objectives. Grove concludes that the Dieppe Raid was not, as claimed, cover for a 'snatch' and also recognises that the decision to form the Intelligence Assault Units to gather intelligence material was not made until after Operation Jubilee had been ordered.

Leah Garret in her 2021 book X-Troop: The Secret Jewish Commandos of World War Two, found new evidence to support O'Keefe's conclusion that Dieppe was a cover for a pinch on naval headquarters. A British unit was created made up of anti-Nazi Germans who had fled the Sudetenland; a five-man team from X Troop was to break into the Enigma machine's room at Dieppe and take the machine and code books. (German speakers were needed to identify the relevant code documents, and possibly, to interrogate prisoners taken.) Garret  found a formerly classified after-action report written by "Maurice Latimer", the Anglicised name of the one Sudeten German who returned from the mission, who reported that his orders were "to proceed immediately to German General HQ in Dieppe to pick up all documents, etc of value, including, if possible, a new German respirator" (almost certainly a code word referring to the Enigma machine). The mission failed, with one member killed, another seriously wounded, and two taken prisoner.

Commemoration

Dieppe War Cemetery

Allied dead were initially buried in a mass grave but at the insistence of the German Army Graves Commission the bodies were reburied at a site used by a British hospital in 1939 in Vertus Wood on the edge of the town.  The Dieppe Canadian War Cemetery headstones have been placed back-to-back in double rows, the norm for a German war cemetery but unusual for Commonwealth War Graves Commission sites. When the Allies liberated Dieppe as part of Operation Fusilade in 1944, the grave markers were replaced with standard CWGC headstones but the layout was left unchanged to avoid disturbing the remains.

Honours and awards
Three Victoria Crosses were awarded for the operation: one to Captain Patrick Porteous, Royal Regiment of Artillery attached to No. 4 Commando, in the British forces; and two to Canadians – the Reverend John Weir Foote, padre to the Royal Hamilton Light Infantry and Lieutenant Colonel "Cec" Merritt of the South Saskatchewan Regiment.

Porteous was severely wounded in the battle but was evacuated at the end of the battle; both Foote and Merritt were captured and became prisoners of war, although in the instance of Foote, he deliberately abandoned his landing craft and chose to be captured so that he could minister to his fellow Canadians who were now POWs.

Marcel Lambert of the 14th Army Tank Regiment (The Calgary Regiment (Tank)), fought aggressively in the battle and was captured. He, along with all the participants in the raid, was awarded a "certificate" from the Government of France. In the 1980s the Government of Canada issued to all raid veterans a "volunteer service medal."

Despite the failure of the operation, Major General Roberts was awarded the Distinguished Service Order.  Among the enlisted personnel, Private William A. Haggard of the South Saskatchewan Regiment was awarded the Distinguished Conduct Medal, and subsequently, field promoted to lieutenant, for his actions during the raid.

A Canadian signalman, Sergeant David Lloyd Hart, was awarded the Military Medal for his efforts during the raid. Hart maintained what became the sole line of radio communications between the men ashore and the commanders out at sea. He is credited with saving the lives of 100 men through his signals work, being able to order their retreat. Hart later became the longest-serving officer in the Canadian Armed Forces, serving in active and honorary roles for 81 years. He died in March 2019, aged 101.

U.S. Army Ranger Corporal Frank Koons became the first American soldier in the Second World War to receive a British award for bravery in action, a Military Medal.

See also
 Beach Comber, a famous war pigeon that was highly decorated for his role in the Dieppe Raid.
 Operation Jubilee order of battle for all units involved.
 Dieppe, a Canadian television miniseries that dramatised the events leading up to Operation Jubilee.

Notes

References

Citations

Works cited

 Atkin, Ronald. Dieppe 1942: The Jubilee Disaster. London: Book Club Associates, 1980. .
 
 
 
 Buckingham, William. D-Day: The First 72 hours. Stroud, Gloucestershire, UK: Tempus Publishing. 2004. .
 Campbell, J. P. Dieppe Revisited: A Documentary Investigation. London: Cass, 1993. .
 
 Churchill, Sir Winston. The Second World War: The Hinge of Fate. Cambridge, Massachusetts: Houghton Mifflin, 1950.
 Copp, Terry A Nation at War, 1939–1945. Waterloo, Ontario: Wilfrid Laurier Press, 2004. .
 Copp, Terry and Mike Bechthold. The Canadian Battlefields in Northern France: Dieppe and the Channel Ports. Waterloo: WLU Press, 2011. 
 Dumais, Lucien A. Un Canadien français à Dieppe. Paris: Éditions France-Empire, 1968.
 Dunning, James. The Fighting Fourth. Stroud Sutton, 2003. .
 Ford, Ken. Dieppe 1942: Prelude to D-Day Campaign 127 Oxford: Osprey, 2004 .
 Fowler, Will. Allies at Dieppe. Oxford: Osprey, 2012. .
 
 Gilbert, Val.  A Display of Lights (9): The Lives and Puzzles of the Telegraph's Six Greatest Cryptic Crossword Setters. London: Macmillan (Telegraph Group Limited), 2008.  .
 
 Griffins, Richard. Marshal Pétain. London: Constable, 1970. 
 Hamilton, Nigel. Monty: The Making of a General. London: Hamish Hamilton Ltd., 1981..
 Henry, Hugh G. Dieppe Through the Lens of the German War photographer. London: After the Battle, 1993. . A Canadian historian covers the actions of each one of the 29 tanks disembarked on the raid with photos, oral history and primary sources. The author later did his doctoral dissertation on the raid.
 Hughes-Wilson, John. Military Intelligence Blunders and Cover-ups. Bath: Robinson. 2004. .
 Król, Wacław. Zarys działań polskiego lotnictwa w Wielkiej Brytanii 1940–1945 (History of the Polish Air Forces in Great Britain 1940–1945). Warsaw: Wydawnictwa Komunikacji i Łączności, 1990. .
 Leasor, James. Green Beach.  London: House of Stratus, 2011, First edition 2008. .
 
 Maguire, Eric. "Evaluation." Dieppe, August 19. London: J. Cape, 1963.
 O'Keefe, David. "One Day In August : The Untold Story Behind Canada's Tragedy At Dieppe", Alfred A Knopf Canada, 2013, .
 Poolton, Jack with Jayne Poolton-Turney. Destined to Survive: A Dieppe Veteran's Story. Toronto: Dundurn Press 1998. .
 Robertson, Terence. Dieppe: The Shame and the Glory. Boston: Little, Brown, 1st U.S. edition, 1962.

 
 
 Stacey, Colonel C.P. "The Lessons of Dieppe."  Report No. 128: The Lessons of Dieppe and their Influence on the Operation Overlord. Ottawa, Canada: Department of National Defence Canadian Forces, 1944.
 
 Taylor, A.J.P. The Second World War: An Illustrated History. London: Penguin Books, 1976. .
 
 Villa, Brian Loring. Unauthorized Action: Mountbatten and the Dieppe Raid. Oxford: Oxford University Press, 1991. .
 Weal, John. Focke-Wulf Fw 190 Aces of the Western Front. London: Osprey, 1996. .
 Whitaker, Denis and Shelagh. Dieppe: Tragedy to Triumph. Whitby, Ontario: McGraw-Hill Ryerson, 1993.

Further reading
 
  Operation Jubilee despatch submitted by Captain John Hughes-Hallett on 30 August 1942

External links

 Dieppe: a German Learning Experience - Lecture to the Joint Services Command and Staff College, Shrivenham
 WWII: The Dieppe Raid – Canada at War  
The Dieppe Raid, BBC History 
 The Dieppe Raid – Saving the lives of 85 Canadians by Polish Destroyer, ORP Slazak
 The Dieppe Raid – The Canadian Encyclopedia (via archive.org)
 Raid on Dieppe Militaryhistoryonline.com
 The Contentious Legacy of Dieppe – CBC Digital Archives
 A Look at the Dieppe Raid through Air Photographs – Laurier Centre for Military Strategic and Disarmament Studies, Wilfrid Laurier University
 PDF: David Ian Hall The German view
 Official History of the Canadian Army (Vol 1) at Hyperwar Foundation
 The Raid on Dieppe, 19 August 1942
 Dieppe: Losses, Comments and Aftermath
 Timeline lahistoriaconmapas.com

Conflicts in 1942
1942 in France
Battles and operations of World War II involving Poland
Battles of World War II involving Canada
Military history of Canada during World War II
Battles of World War II involving Germany
Battles of World War II involving the United States
World War II British Commando raids
World War II sites in France
Royal Hamilton Light Infantry (Wentworth Regiment)
South Saskatchewan Regiment
Essex and Kent Scottish
Royal Regiment of Canada
Fusiliers Mont-Royal
King's Own Calgary Regiment
Lorne Scots (Peel, Dufferin and Halton Regiment)
Toronto Scottish Regiment (Queen Elizabeth The Queen Mother's Own)
Amphibious operations of World War II
August 1942 events
Dieppe
Amphibious operations involving the United Kingdom
Amphibious operations involving Canada